Laxton is a village and civil parish in the East Riding of Yorkshire, England.

The civil parish is formed by the village of Laxton and the hamlets of Cotness, Metham and Saltmarshe. A very small part of Yokefleet also falls within the parish.
According to the 2011 UK census, Laxton parish had a population of 314, a reduction on the 2001 UK census figure of 322.

Laxton lies within the Parliamentary constituency of Haltemprice and Howden an area that mainly consists of middle class suburbs, towns and villages. The area is affluent, placed as the 10th most affluent in the country in a Barclays Private Clients survey, and has one of the highest proportions of owner-occupiers in the country.

The village is served by Saltmarshe railway station on the Sheffield to Hull Line.

In 1823 Laxton was in the civil parish of Howden, and in the Wapentake and Liberty of Howdenshire. Population at the time was 268. Occupations included seven farmers, two carpenters, a corn miller, a tailor, a shopkeeper, a shoemaker, a schoolmaster and public house landlords of the White Horse; the Mason's Arms, who was also a bricklayer; and the Cross Keys, who was also a blacksmith. Resident was the ecclesiastical parish curate and a Philip Saltmarshe, Esquire of Saltmarshe.

References

External links

Villages in the East Riding of Yorkshire
Civil parishes in the East Riding of Yorkshire